Sanjiv Chadha is an Indian businessman. He is the Managing Director and Chief Executive Officer of Bank of Baroda.

Career
Chadha started his career in 1987 with State Bank of India. He was the Managing Director & Chief Executive Officer of SBI. He worked with State Bank of India for 33 years. He became the Managing Director and Chief Executive Officer of Bank of Baroda from 1 February 2020.

References

Living people
Indian bankers
Indian chief executives
Indian businesspeople
Year of birth missing (living people)